My Morning Jacket / Songs: Ohia is a split EP issued by Jade Tree in 2002.

Track listing
Tracks 1, 2, 3, and 4 by My Morning Jacket. Track 5 by Songs: Ohia.

"O Is the One That Is Real" (Jim James) – 3:39
"How Do You Know" (Jim James) – 4:48
"Come Closer" (Jim James) – 4:59
"The Year in Review" (Jim James) – 2:34
"Translation" (A.S.of R.) – 10:08

References

2002 EPs
Split EPs
My Morning Jacket EPs
Jason Molina albums
Jade Tree (record label) EPs
Albums produced by Jim James